The Fair-Haired Dumbbell is a building located at 11 Northeast Martin Luther King Jr. Blvd., in Portland, Oregon's Burnside Bridgehead project in the Kerns neighborhood, United States. Its exterior design was created by Los Angeles artist James Jean, and was selected by the Regional Arts & Culture Council, the city, and Guerrilla Development. Dan Cohen painted the artwork in June 2017.

See also
 Kevin Cavenaugh

References

External links

 

Buildings and structures in Portland, Oregon
Kerns, Portland, Oregon